Fatima bint Hamad al-Fudayliyya, also known as Al-Shaykha al-Fudayliyya (died 1831) was an 18th and 19th-century Muslim scholar of hadith and jurist. She is considered one of the last scholars in a long line of female muhaddith.

Biography

Early life 
Fatima bint Hamad al-Fudayliyya was born before the end of the twelfth Islamic century, and soon excelled in the art of calligraphy and the various Islamic sciences. She had a special interest in hadith, read a good deal on the subject, received the diplomas of a good many scholars, and acquired a reputation as an important muhaddith in her own right.

Scholarship 
She was also an expert on usul, fiqh and tafsir. In Mecca her lectures were attended by many eminent muhaddith, who received certificates from her. Among them, of mention in particular are Umar al-Hanafi and Muhammad Salih. The scholars who studied with her praised her for her piety, righteousness and practice of zuhd. She was also highly regarded for writing books in beautiful calligraphy.

Later life and death 
Towards the end of her life she settled in Makkah where she founded a rich public library. She died in 1831 (Hijri 1247).

References 

18th-century Muslim scholars of Islam
19th-century Muslim scholars of Islam
Women scholars of Islam
1831 deaths